Another Woman may refer to:

 Another Woman (1988 film)
 Another Woman (2015 film)